Norma Lazareno (born 5 November 1943) is a Mexican film and television actress.

Filmography

Televisión 
 La mexicana y el güero (2021) - Doña Crucita Rojas 
 Simplemente María (2015-2016) - Olivia Aparicio Vda. de Bazaine
 Gossip Girl Acapulco (2013) - Cecilia 'Ceci' López-Haro
 Libre para amarte (2013) - María Teresa Lascurain
 Estrella2 (2013) 
 Porque el amor manda (2012-2013) - Tracy Rodríguez
 Como dice el dicho (2011-2015) - Leonor / Alicia / Dalia 
 La rosa de Guadalupe (2008-2013) - Esperanza / Catita / Rosario / Laila 
 Hasta que el dinero nos separe (2009-2010) - Rosario Álvarez del Castillo
 Destilando amor (2007) - Nuria Toledo de Duarte
 Niña amada mía (2003) - Judith Alcázar de Rincón del Valle
 ¡Vivan los niños! (2002-2003) - Adelina
 Carita de ángel (2000-2001)
 Por tu amor (1999) - Adelaida Zambrano 
 Preciosa (1998) - Regina de la Diva
 El secreto de Alejandra (1997-1998) - Paulina
 No tengo madre (1997) - Margarita Malpica
 Mujer, casos de la vida real (1996-2001)
 Cañaveral de pasiones (1996) - Hilda de Cisneros
 Caminos cruzados (1994-1995) - Gigi Dumont 
 Valentina (1993-1994) - Alicia de Valdepeñas
 En carne propia (1990-1991) - Gertrudis de Serrano
 Mi pequeña Soledad (1990) - Yolanda Salazar Ballesteros
 Un rostro en mi pasado (1989-1990) - Lina Mabarak 
 Nuevo amanecer (1988-1989) - Marissa 
 La trampa (1988) - Karin
 Senda de gloria (1987) - Angelina Beloff
 Cómo duele callar (1987) - Mercedes de Cisneros
 Te amo (1984-1985) - Victoria
 Tú eres mi destino (1984) - Mercedes
 Mañana es primavera (1982) - Sonia
 Infamia (1981) - Alma de Andreu
 El árabe (1980) - Zarda
 Al salir el sol (1980) - Amparo
 Caminemos (1980) - Adelina
 La llama de tu amor (1979)
 Los bandidos de Río Frío (1976) - Casilda
 Lo imperdonable (1975) - Sara Fonseca
 La tierra (1974) - Gabriela
 Cartas sin destino (1973)
 Nosotros los pobres (1973) - Yolanda 'La Tísica' 
 Las fieras (1972) - Hélène
 Pequeñeces (1971) - Carmen Tagle
 La gata (1970) - Mónica
 Un ángel en el fango (1967)

Films 
 Yo también soy Marilyn (2012) - Tia Begoña 
 El estudiante (2009) - Alicia 
 La hacienda del terror (2005)
 La tregua (2003) - Rosa
 El verdugo (2003)
 Todo contigo (2002) - Doña Carmen 
 Religión, la fuerza de la costumbre (2000)
 En las manos de Dios (1996)
 Ataque salvaje (1995)
 Ansiedad asesina (1992) - Begoña Mayorial 
 Jóvenes delincuentes (1991)
 Deliciosa sinvergüenza (1990) - Madre superiora 
 Marcados por el destino (1990) - Gloria 
 El pozo del diablo (1990)
 Señoritas a disgusto (1989) - María 
 Me llaman violencia (1989)
 Entre picudos te veas (1989)
 Pero sigo siendo el rey (1988)
 Para que dure no se apure (1988)
 El último triunfo (1988) - Doña Juanita 
 El tráiler asesino (1986)
 Gavilán o paloma (1985)
 Los pepenadores de acá (1985) - Rutila
 El escuadrón de la muerte (1985) - Señora Balbuena 
 Territorio sin ley (1984)
 Niño pobre, niño rico (1983) - Laura 
 Lazos de sangre (1983)
 La fuga de Carrasco (1983)
 Terror en los barrios (1983) - Gabriela Narváez 
 Las musiqueras (1983) - Adriana 
 Vividores de mujeres (1982) - Osbelia 
 La sangre de nuestra raza (1982) - Norma
 Al cabo que ni quería (1982)
 La guerra es un buen negocio (1982) - Celia Vidal 
 Ojo por ojo (1981)
 Mojado de nacimiento (1981)
 La jorobada (1981)
 California Dancing Club (1981)
 La casa prohibida (1981)
 Barrio de campeones (1981)
 Las tres tumbas (1980)
 El charro del misterio (1980)
 El secuestro de los cien millones (1979)
 De Cocula es el mariachi (1978)
 Terremoto en Guatemala (1978)
 Deportados (1977)
 El alegre divorciado (1976)
 El compadre más padre (1976)
 Supervivientes de los Andes (1976)
 Rapiña (1975)
 El Cristo de los milagros (1975)
 El desconocido (1974)
 Mulato (1974)
 La corona de un campeón (1974)
 El tigre de Santa Julia (1974)
 Uno para la horca (1974)
 Pobre, pero honrada! (1973)
 El juez de la soga (1973)
 La satánica (1973)
 El sargento Pérez (1973)
 Eva y Darío (1973)
 Los ángeles de la tarde (1972)
 Los perturbados (1972)
 Tampico (1972)
 Triángulo (1972)
 Chico Ramos (1971)
 Mama Dolores (1971)
 La casa del farol rojo (1971)
 Para servir a usted (1971)
 Liberación (1971)
 La venganza de las mujeres vampiro (1970)
 ¡Ahí madre! (1970)
 Fallaste corazón (1970)
 Quinto patio (1970)
 Las chicas malas del padre Méndez (1970)
 Fray Don Juan (1970)
 El amor de María Isabel (1970)
 La trinchera (1969)
 Trampas de amor (1969)
 El amor y esas cosas (1969)
 Las infieles (1969)
 Valentin Armienta, el vengador (1969)
 El Yaqui (1969)
 Al rojo vivo (1969)
 La horripilante bestia humana (1969)
 La muñeca perversa (1969)
 Las pecadoras (1968)
 El libro de piedra (1968)
 La endemoniada (1968)
 Vagabundo en la lluvia (1968)
 Hasta el viento tiene miedo (1968)
 María Isabel (1968)
 El centauro Pancho Villa (1967)
 El mundo loco de los jóvenes (1967)
 Don Juan 67 (1967)
 Arrullo de Dios (1967)
 Los caifanes (1967)
 Estrategia matrimonial (1967)
 El norteño (1963)
 Estos años violentos (1962)
 El dolor de pagar la renta (1960)
 La llamada de la muerte (1960)
 Dicen que soy hombre malo (1960)
 Me gustan valentones! (1959)
 Mujeres encantadoras (1958)
 Concurso de belleza (1958)
 La virtud desnuda (1957)
 El campeón ciclista (1957)
 Juventud desenfrenada (1956)
 Maldita ciudad (un drama cómico) (1954)

Theater 
 Extraños en un tren (2016)
 La familia real
 Cómo envejecer con gracia
 Los árboles mueren de pie
 Ciego amor
 Esta monja ¡No!
 Sueña
 Algo pasó (1988-1989)

References

Bibliography
 Greene, Doyle. Mexploitation Cinema: A Critical History of Mexican Vampire, Wrestler, Ape-Man and Similar Films, 1957–1977. McFarland, 2005.

External links
 

1943 births
Living people
Mexican film actresses
Mexican television actresses
Actresses from Veracruz